Darodilia is a genus of beetles in the family Carabidae, containing the following species:

 Darodilia castelnaui W.J.Macleay, 1888
 Darodilia curta Sloane, 1915
 Darodilia emarginata Sloane, 1898
 Darodilia liopleura (Chaudoir, 1869)
 Darodilia longula Tschitscherine, 1902
 Darodilia macilenta Sloane, 1895
 Darodilia mandibularis Castelnau, 1867
 Darodilia ovicollis (W.J.Macleay, 1871)
 Darodilia robusta Sloane, 1900
 Darodilia rugisternis Sloane, 1895

References

Pterostichinae